The Asian Film Awards are presented annually by the Asian Film Awards Academy to recognise the excellence of the film professionals in the film industries of Asian cinema.

History

On January 29, 2007, Wilfred Wong, the Chairman of Hong Kong International Film Festival Society, announced the launch of the Asian Film Awards (AFA). The 1st Asian Film Awards occurred on March 20, 2007, on the opening night of the 31st Hong Kong International Film Festival (HKIFF) in Hong Kong Convention and Exhibition Centre. It honoured the best film achievements of the Asian cinema in the year 2006. It was attended by about 4000 guests from around the world.

The AFA Presentation Ceremony takes place as part of the Entertainment Expo Hong Kong Opening Gala. Eminent filmmakers and superstars from around the world are invited to bestow awards upon the winner(s) of each category, making the ceremony a dazzling extravaganza as well as an influential cultural event.

Throughout its history and since its inauguration in 2007, Chinese-language films and professionals from China, Taiwan, and Hong Kong have dominated the awards.

The trophy

On February 13, 2007, the Hong Kong Trade Development Council hosted a celebration of Park Chan-wook's I'm a Cyborg, But That's OK announcement of being the opening film for the 31st Hong Kong International Film Festival at a reception in Berlin. At the same event the AFA trophy, designed by award-winning production designer, William Chang, was also unveiled.

According to William Chang, his inspiration behind the artwork was his admiration to a combination of architectural drawings and his own collection of antique statues. Measuring 36 cm (14 in), the trophy symbolises the joy and the accomplishment of all the award winners.

The current trophy is gold as a whole but had changed significantly before. The first trophies that were handed in 2007 has its trophy in black with a white base. In the 2nd AFA, the current gold colour was used as whole but in 2009 for its 3rd AFA instead of a gold base, it has a black base. Then in 2010, the whole gold trophy had returned and now used nowadays.

Eligibility, nominations and voting

To be eligible, films must be feature length (more than 60 minutes); be in 35mm or 70mm film format or digital format suitable for exhibition in cinemas; and be fiction films from Asia. This encompasses all the cinemas of Asia: East Asia, Central Asia, South Asia, Southeast Asia and West Asia. Additionally, the films must have English subtitles.

The films must have been released between January 1 and December 31 of the year preceding the awards ceremony, and have been exhibited through a domestic theatrical release and distribution to at least one other country; been premiered at an international film festival; or received national film awards.

The Hong Kong International Film Festival Society compile the preliminary nomination list with the participation of the two parties who can submit films for the consideration to be included in the nomination list which are: 
 the Asian Film Awards Official Submission Organisations are composed of recognised film organizations from different Asian territories. Each Official Submission Organisation can submit up to three films to represent their territory.
 the Asian Film Awards Jury is composed of film professionals from around the world. Each Jury Member can recommend up to two additional nominations in each Category.

After the Society finalised the nomination list, the Jury and the Voting Members (composed of previous winners from past AFA) would then vote in an Online Balloting System where it would be counted, tallied and kept confidential until the day of the AFA by a reputable firm of certified public accountants.

Award categories
 Best Film
 Best Director
 Best Actor
 Best Actress
 Best Supporting Actor: since 2008
 Best Supporting Actress: since 2008
 Best Newcomer: since 2009
 Best Screenwriter  
 Best Cinematographer  
 Best Production Designer  
 Best Composer  
 Best Editor  
 Best Visual Effects
 Best Costume Designer : since 2010

Special Awards
These special awards are not always presented on a consistent annual basis. The Society chooses the special awards to be given for a certain year.

 Asian Film Award for Excellence in Scholarship in Asian Cinema 
 Asian Film Award for Outstanding Contribution to Asian Cinema 
 Nielsen Box Office Star of Asia Award  
 Lifetime Achievement Award: since 2008
 The Edward Yang New Talent Award: since 2008
 The Asian Film Award for Top-Grossing Film Director: since 2009
 The Asian Film Award for Top-Grossing Asian Film: since 2011
 Award for the Promotion of Asian Cinema: since 2011
 Excellence in Asian Cinema Award: since 2013
 The Next Generation Award: since 2016

People's Choice Awards
 People's Choice for the Best Asian Film: 2009 (defunct)
 People's Choice for Best Actor : since 2010
 People's Choice for Best Actress : since 2010

 The asterisk indicates the awards that were renamed for a certain Asian Film Awards Presentation Ceremony. Their first and original names are used in this list.

Major award winners

Presentation Ceremonies
2021: The 15th edition of the awards presentation hosted by actress Kim Gyu-ri and broadcaster Lee Seung-guk was held on October 8, 2021 in Busan at  Haeundae. 36 films from 8 Asian regions competed for 16 awards. Director Kiyoshi Kurosawa's Wife of a Spy (2020) won the best picture award at the ceremony streamed live on YouTube and Naver.
2023: The 16th edition of the awards presentation hosted by Hong Kong-born Canadian actress Grace Chan and actor Sammy Leung was held on March 12, 2023 at Hong Kong Jockey Club Auditorium in Hong Kong Palace Museum. 30 films from 22 regions and countries have been shortlisted for 81 nominations. Drive My Car by Ryusuke Hamaguchi won the best film award and best direction was awarded to Hirokazu Kore-eda for Broker, whereas Tang Wei's performance in Decision to Leave got her the best actress award. Tony Leung Chiu-wai, a Hong Kong actor and singer, was presented with Asian Film Contribution Award for his contribution to the Asian cinema and the best actor award for his performance in Where the Wind Blows.

See also
Hong Kong International Film Festival
16th Asian Film Awards

References

External links

 Asian Film Awards at IMDb

 
Awards established in 2007
2007 establishments in Hong Kong
Annual events in Hong Kong
2021 disestablishments in Hong Kong
Awards disestablished in 2021